Face to Fate is a Hong Kong television series released overseas in September 2006 and aired locally on TVB Pay Vision Channel in March 2007. The series is an adaptation of wuxia writer Woon Swee Oan's works.

Synopsis
In a war against the Evil, the White Force and the Black Force have a Golden Seal Battle every five years. Each force selects five people to represent its community. Whichever side wins the battle has control of the Wu Xia World for the next five years. However, over the years, the Black Force have become more evil than before, and their goal evolved to destroy all the Good to allow the Evil power to control the world.

The head of the White Force is the Flying Fish Village led by Shum Shing-Nam (David Chiang). In the White Force, the five people who were supposed to represent the community were secretly killed, and hence the series "Face to Fate" begins. In order to participate in the next Golden Seal Battle, the White Force has to look for five more talented people to fight the Black Force. Li Bo-Yee (Frankie Lam), the fortune teller; Lai Yuek-Yee (Raymond Lam), the doctor; and Yip Mung-Sik (Tavia Yeung), are on the mission to look for five talented fighters.

Through their mission, many circumstances led to obstacles into their mission such as Lai Yuek-Yee possess a deadly disease that makes him age prematurely, Mung-Sik is the daughter of a demon of the Black Force, etc. As the story progresses, the three do find five more people to battle. Unfortunately, one of them is killed, forcing Li Bo-Yee to replace him.

Meanwhile, Lai Leuk-Yee meets the love of his life, Yin Ye-Loi (Selena Li), who also has a secret identity. Because of this secret identity, the White Force does not like Yin Ye-Loi. One of the White Force attacks Ye-Loi, causing Lai Leuk-Yee to join the Black Force...

Cast
 Note: Some of the characters' names are in Cantonese romanisation.

External links
TVB.com  Face to Fate - Official Website 
Windy-Goddess.net Face to Fate - Episodic Synopsis

TVB dramas
Hong Kong wuxia television series
Adaptations of works by Woon Swee Oan
2006 Hong Kong television series debuts
2006 Hong Kong television series endings
2007 Hong Kong television series debuts
2007 Hong Kong television series endings